The 2018 World Singles Ninepin Bowling Classic Championships was the seventh edition of the world singles championships and was held in Cluj-Napoca, Romania, from 20 May to 26 May 2018 .

All the men's competitions was dominated by Vilmoš Zavarko, who won gold medals in every event. In the women's sprint triumphed Ines Maričić (Croatia), in the single German Sina Beißer, while gold medal in the combined was won by Serbian Jasmina Anđelković, who set a new world record 890 pins. Mixed tandem rivalry was won by Czechs Renáta Navrkalová and Jan Endršt.

Participants 
Below is the list of countries who participated in the championships and the requested number of athlete places for each.

  (8)
  (6)
  (13)
  (12)
  (5)
  (5)
  (3)
  (12)
  (12)
  (7)
  (4)
  (6)
  (9)
  (12)
  (10)
  (10)
  (2)

Schedule 
Seven events were held.

All times are local (UTC+3).

Medal summary

Medal table

Men

Women

Mixed

References 

 
World Singles Ninepin Bowling Classic Championships
2018 in bowling
2018 in Romanian sport
International sports competitions hosted by Romania
Sport in Cluj-Napoca
May 2018 sports events in Europe